Billy Ray Latham (January 12, 1938, Arkansas – August 19, 2018, Nashville, TN) was an American banjo player. He was best known as a member of the Kentucky Colonels (1961-c.1974). He then joined The Dillards in 1974, and left c.1978.

He died in 2018, having been in poor health for years.

References

1938 births
2018 deaths
American banjoists
The Dillards members
Kentucky Colonels (band) members